Kalehkin (also Romanized as Kalehkīn; also known as Gelekin) is a village in Piran Rural District, in the Central District of Piranshahr County, West Azerbaijan Province, Iran. At the 2006 census, its population was 808, in 140 families.

References 

Populated places in Piranshahr County